Rhythm and Jews is an album by American klezmer group The Klezmatics. It was released in 1993 via Flying Fish.

The album includes many traditional melodies of the hassidic repertoire and of the repertoire of 1920s first generation American klezmer pioneer Naftule Brandwein.

Critical reception
The Washington Post wrote that the album contains "traditional klezmer tunes with very American syncopation, blue notes and rhythmic punch."

Track listing
1. Fun Tashlikh
2. NY Psycho Freylekhs
3. Di Sapozhkelekh
4. Clarinet Yontev
5. Araber Tants
6. Di zun vet Aruntergeyn
7. Tsiveles Bulgar
8. Violin Doyna
9. Honikzaft
10. Bulgar A La Klezmatics
11. Shnirele Perele
Klezmatic Fantasy: A Suite Mostly In D:
12. I.  Der yidisher soldat in di trenches
13. II. Bukoviner Freylikhs
14. III. Buhusher Khosid
15. IV. Terkish-Bulgarish

Personnel 
Frank London - trumpet, cornet, keyboards, vocals
Lorin Sklamberg - accordion, keyboards, lead vocals
Paul Morrissett - bass, vocals
David Licht - drums
David Krakauer - clarinet, bass clarinet
Alicia Svigals - violin, vocals
Mahmoud Fadl - percussion (Track 1)
Alan Bern - accordion (2)
Tine Kinderman - backing vocals (4, 11)
Christoph Herrman - backing vocals (4)

References

The Klezmatics albums
1990 albums
Yiddish culture in the United States